LATAM or LatAm may refer to:

 Latin America, as a portmanteau (frequently stylized as LatAm)
 LATAM Airlines Group, an airline holding company created by the merger of LAN Airlines and TAM Airlines
 LATAM Argentina, a defunct LATAM Airlines Group operating unit formerly based in Argentina
 LATAM Brasil, a LATAM Airlines Group operating unit based in Brazil
 LATAM Cargo Brasil, a cargo subsidiary of LATAM Brasil
 LATAM Chile, a LATAM Airlines Group operating unit based in Chile
 LATAM Cargo Chile, a cargo subsidiary of LATAM Chile
 LATAM Express, a subsidiary of LATAM Chile
 LATAM Colombia, a LATAM Airlines Group operating unit based in Colombia
 LATAM Cargo Colombia, a cargo subsidiary of LATAM Colombia
 LATAM Ecuador, a LATAM Airlines Group operating unit based in Ecuador
 LATAM Paraguay, a LATAM Airlines Group operating unit based in Paraguay
 LATAM Perú, a LATAM Airlines Group operating unit based in Peru
 LATAM Challenge Series, an auto racing series based in Mexico
 Mas Air, a cargo airline formerly named LATAM Cargo Mexico